Anisophyllea curtisii is a species of plant in the Anisophylleaceae family. It is endemic to Peninsular Malaysia. It is threatened by habitat loss.

References

curtisii
Endemic flora of Peninsular Malaysia
Vulnerable plants
Taxonomy articles created by Polbot